Terry James Lubinsky is an American radio host. He is also executive producer/director of many Public Broadcasting Service (PBS) pledge-drive programs. He presents oldies-format music programs airing on PBS.

Early life and career 
Lubinsky was born in Bradley Beach, New Jersey. His grandfather, Herman Lubinsky, Sr., founded Savoy Records in Newark, and introduced acts that would be influential in modern popular music (Doo-Wop, Motown, disco and Top 40). Lubinsky, Sr., also founded and operated New Jersey's first radio station WNJ. His uncle, "Buzzy", was also a well-known club disc jockey in New Jersey.  At 16, TJ Lubinsky obtained his General Equivalency Diploma and accepted his first television job at Monmouth Cable TV-34 in New Jersey, where he learned his craft for television production. He worked on different news, studio, and sport remotes that served 31 towns, boroughs and municipalities along the Jersey Shore.

When he turned 22, Lubinsky was offered a job to work for PBS in South Florida, eventually he was promoted and relocated to Pittsburgh, Pennsylvania, often considered the mecca of oldies music. Taking advantage of that fact, he blended his passion for Doo-Wop, Motown, classic Philly Soul and '60s Rock and Roll oldies into PBS's most successful fundraisers as the creator and executive producer of "Doo-Wop '50", and over 30 national television specials from PBS which archive America's soundtrack from the '50s, '60s and '70s through his "My Music" series. Lubinsky produced the 2005 Stereo Motown Box Set.

Lubinsky is also one of the executive producers of The Very Best Of The Ed Sullivan Show seen on public television.

He helped bring several episodes of Doctor Who to the US which had not been shown in the country before.  In 2003-2005, he also archived and restored several introductions made for the American broadcast of Doctor Who episodes from the Tom Baker era, with voice-overs by Howard Da Silva. These were included on the BBC DVD releases.

Lubinsky spent four years as host and DJ on the WJRZ-FM Sunday Night Request Show, where he hosted five live hours by request through 2009, when the station flipped formats to Adult Contemporary. In July, 2013, Lubinsky returned to a weekly Sunday night program on WJRZ. Lubinsky decided to end his WJRZ radio program in 2014 to help care for his father, Herman Lubinsky, Jr. prior to his passing, and to concentrate on new TV projects (including editing new digitally remastered TV feature-length movies of classic "Doctor Who" episodes featuring Tom Baker for the BBC in America". In April 2016, Lubinsky returned to the radio, this time on Friday nights live from 8pm to midnight, up the New Jersey dial to Oldies 1079, WOLD-LP and online and around the world at woldradio.com, where he plays music and interviews with artists from the 1950s, 1960s, 1970s, and 1980s and live requests and dedications from his listeners. Lubinsky is still making  television projects for public broadcasting. Since 2018, Lubinsky does his radio shows on twitch and mixcloud.

TJ Lubinsky PBS television productions
1999 - Doo Wop 50 (creator/producer)
2000 - More Doo Wop 50 (creator/producer)
2000 - Doo Wop 51 (creator/producer)
2001 - More Doo Wop 51 (creator/producer)
2000 - Rock, Rhythm, and Doo Wop (creator/producer)
2000 - More Rock, Rhythm and Doo Wop (creator/producer)
2001 - This Land Is Your Land (creator/executive producer)
2001 - The Ed Sullivan Show (executive producer, 120 PBS Episodes)
2001 - The Sound Of Pittsburgh (creator/executive producer)
2001 - Soul and Inspiration (creator/producer)
2002 - R&B 40 (creator/executive producer)
2002 - Timeless Music (creator/executive producer)
2002 - Red, White and Rock (creator/executive producer)
2003 - This Land Is Our Land (creator/producer)
2003 - Rock and Roll 50 (creator/producer)
2003 - Rhythm, Love and Soul (creator/executive producer)
2003 - 70s Soul Superstars (creator/executive producer)
2004 - Magic Moments: The Best of 50s Pop (creator/executive producer)
2004 - Get Down Tonight - Disco (creator/executive producer/director)
2005 - Motown - Early Years (creator/executive producer/director)
2005 - Funky Soul Superstars (creator/executive producer/director)
2005 - 60s Experience (creator/executive producer/director)
2005 - Doo Wop Anthology (creator/executive producer/director)
2005 - Moments To Remember (creator/executive producer/director)
2006 - Movie Songs (creator/executive producer/director)
2006 - Country Pop Legends (creator/executive producer/director)
2006 - The British Beat (creator/executive producer/director)
2006 - The 70s (creator/executive producer/director)
2006 - Doo Wop's Best on PBS (creator/executive producer)
2006 - 50s Pop Parade (creator/executive producer/director)
2006 - The 60s Experience II (creator/executive producer/director)
2007 - Doo Wop Love Songs (Creator/Executive Producer/Director)
2008 - My Music: My Generation - The 60s (TV documentary) (executive producer) 
2008 - That's Amore!: Italian-American Favorites (TV movie) (executive producer) 
2008 - My Music: Love Songs of the '50s and '60s (TV movie) (executive producer) 
2009 - Ed Sullivan's Rock and Roll Classics: The 60s (TV movie) (executive producer)
2009 - My Music: Motown Memories (TV movie) (executive producer)
2009 - My Music: The Big Band Years (TV movie) (executive producer)
2010 - My Music: John Sebastian Presents Folk Rewind (TV movie) (executive producer)
2010 - My Music: Aretha Franklin Presents Soul Rewind (TV movie (executive producer)
2010 - My Music: When Irish Eyes Are Smiling (TV movie) (executive producer)
2011 - My Music: '60s Pop, Rock & Soul (TV movie (executive producer)
2011 - My Music: Rock, Pop & Doo Wop (TV movie (executive producer)
2012 - My Music: Burt Bacharach's Best (TV movie) (co-executive producer) 
2012 - My Music: Big Band Vocalists (TV movie) (executive producer)
2018 - My Music: Doo Wop Generations (TV movie) (creator/producer)

Personal life
Lubinsky is married to Wendy Lawton, and has three children, Kaitlyn, Ryan, and Noah.

References

External links
 TJ's Lubinsky's Facebook page
 

American radio personalities
Television producers from Pennsylvania
Living people
People from Bradley Beach, New Jersey
Radio personalities from Pittsburgh
American entertainers
Year of birth missing (living people)
Television producers from New Jersey